A chief executive officer (CEO), also known as a central executive officer, chief administrator officer (CAO) or just chief executive (CE), is one of a number of corporate executives charged with the management of an organization especially an independent legal entity such as a company or nonprofit institution. CEOs find roles in a range of organizations, including public and private corporations, non-profit organizations and even some government organizations (notably state-owned enterprises). The CEO of a corporation or company typically reports to the board of directors and is charged with maximizing the value of the business, which may include maximizing the share price, market share, revenues or another element. In the non-profit and government sector, CEOs typically aim at achieving outcomes related to the organization's mission, usually provided by legislation. CEOs are also frequently assigned the role of main manager of the organization and the highest-ranking officer in the C-suite.

Origins
The term "chief executive officer" is attested as early as 1782, when an ordinance of the Congress of the Confederation used the term to refer to governors and other leaders of the executive branches of each of the Thirteen Colonies. In draft additions to the Oxford English Dictionary published online in 2011, the Dictionary says that the use of "CEO" as an acronym for a chief executive officer originated in Australia, with the first attestation being in 1914. The first American usage cited is from 1972.

Responsibilities
The responsibilities of an organization's CEO are set by the organization's board of directors or other authority, depending on the organization's structure. They can be far-reaching or quite limited, and are typically enshrined in a formal delegation of authority regarding business administration. Typically, responsibilities include being an active decision-maker on business strategy and other key policy issues, leader, manager, and executor. The communicator role can involve speaking to the press and the rest of the outside world, as well as to the organization's management and employees; the decision-making role involves high-level decisions about policy and strategy. The CEO is tasked with implementing the goals, targets and strategic objectives as determined by the board of directors.

As an executive officer of the company, the CEO reports the status of the business to the board of directors, motivates employees, and drives change within the organization. As a manager, the CEO presides over the organization's day-to-day operations. The CEO is the person who is ultimately accountable for a company's business decisions, including those in operations, marketing, business development, finance, human resources, etc.

The use of the CEO title is not necessarily limited to describing the owner or the head of a company. For example, the CEO of a political party is often entrusted with fundraising, particularly for election campaigns.

International use
In some countries, there is a dual board system with two separate boards, one executive board for the day-to-day business and one supervisory board for control purposes (selected by the shareholders). In these countries, the CEO presides over the executive board and the chairperson presides over the supervisory board, and these two roles will always be held by different people. This ensures a distinction between management by the executive board and governance by the supervisory board. This allows for clear lines of authority. The aim is to prevent a conflict of interest and too much power being concentrated in the hands of one person.

In the United States, the board of directors (elected by the shareholders) is often equivalent to the supervisory board, while the executive board may often be known as the executive committee (the division/subsidiary heads and C-level officers that report directly to the CEO).

In the United States, and in business, the executive officers are usually the top officers of a corporation, the chief executive officer (CEO) being the best-known type. The definition varies; for instance, the California Corporate Disclosure Act defines "executive officers" as the five most highly compensated officers not also sitting on the board of directors. In the case of a sole proprietorship, an executive officer is the sole proprietor. In the case of a partnership, an executive officer is a managing partner, senior partner, or administrative partner. In the case of a limited liability company, an executive officer is any member, manager, or officer.

Related positions

Depending on the organization, a CEO may have several subordinate executives to help run the day-to-day administration of the company, each of whom has specific functional responsibilities referred to as senior executives, executive officers or corporate officers. Subordinate executives are given different titles in different organizations, but one common category of subordinate executive, if the CEO is also the president, is the vice president (VP). An organization may have more than one vice president, each tasked with a different area of responsibility (e.g., VP of finance, VP of human resources). Examples of subordinate executive officers who typically report to the CEO include the chief operating officer (COO), chief financial officer (CFO), chief strategy officer (CSO), and chief business officer (CBO). The public relations-focused position of chief reputation officer is sometimes included as one such subordinate executive officer, but, as suggested by Anthony Johndrow, CEO of Reputation Economy Advisors, it can also be seen as "simply another way to add emphasis to the role of a modern-day CEO – where they are both the external face of, and the driving force behind, an organisation culture".

United States
In the US, the term chief executive officer is used primarily in business, whereas the term executive director is used primarily in the not-for-profit sector. These terms are generally mutually exclusive and refer to distinct legal duties and responsibilities. Implicit in the use of these titles is that the public not be misled and the general standard regarding their use be consistently applied.

United Kingdom
In the UK, chief executive and chief executive officer are used in local government, business, and the charitable sector. , the use of the term director for senior charity staff is deprecated to avoid confusion with the legal duties and responsibilities associated with being a charity director or trustee, which are normally non-executive (unpaid) roles. The term managing director is often used in lieu of chief executive officer.

Celebrity CEOs
Business publicists since the days of Edward Bernays (1891-1995) and his client John D. Rockefeller (1839-1937) and even more successfully the corporate publicists for Henry Ford, promoted the concept of the "celebrity CEO". Business journalists have often adopted this approach, which assumes that the corporate achievements, especially in the arena of manufacturing, are produced by uniquely talented individuals, especially the "heroic CEO". In effect, journalists celebrate a CEO who takes distinctive strategic actions. The model is the celebrity in entertainment, sports, and politics - compare the "great man theory". Guthey et al. argues that "...these individuals are not self-made, but rather are created by a process of widespread media exposure to the point that their actions, personalities, and even private lives function symbolically to represent significant dynamics and tensions prevalent in the contemporary business atmosphere". Journalism thereby exaggerates the importance of the CEO and tends to neglect harder-to-describe broader corporate factors. There is little attention to the intricately organized technical bureaucracy that actually does the work. Hubris sets in when the CEO internalizes the celebrity and becomes excessively self-confident in making complex decisions. There may be an emphasis on the sort of decisions that attract the celebrity journalists.

Research published in 2009 by Ulrike Malmendier and Geoffrey Tate indicates that "firms with award-winning CEOs subsequently underperform, in terms both of stock and of operating performance".

Criticism

Executive compensation

Executive compensation has been a source of criticism following a dramatic rise in pay relative to the average worker's wage. For example, the relative pay was 20-to-1 in 1965 in the US, but had risen to 376-to-1 by 2000. The relative pay differs around the world, and, in some smaller countries, is still around 20-to-1. Observers differ as to whether the rise is due to competition for talent or due to lack of control by compensation committees. In recent years, investors have demanded more say over executive pay.

Diversity

Lack of diversity amongst chief executives has also been a source of criticism. In 2018, 5% of Fortune 500 CEOs were women. The reasons for this are explained or justified in various ways, and may include biological sex differences, male and female differences in Big Five personality traits and temperament, sex differences in psychology and interests, maternity and career breaks, hypergamy, phallogocentrism, the existence of old boy networks, tradition, and the lack of female role models in that regard. Some countries have passed laws mandating boardroom gender quotas.

See also
 CEO succession
 CEO of public schools
 Executive officer
 Glass cliff
 List of books written by CEOs
 List of chief executive officers
 Occupational Information Network
 United States Department of Labor
 Prime minister
 City manager

References

Further reading
 
 
 
 Vancil, Richard F. Passing the baton: Managing the process of CEO succession (Harvard Business School Press, 1987).

External links
 
 

Management occupations
 
E
Positions of authority
Leadership